is a Japanese football player for Omiya Ardija.

Career
Born in Shizuoka Prefecture and raised by Júbilo Iwata's youth ranks, Nakano opted to join University of Tsukuba in 2014. He shone with that shirt, even scoring five goals in the national cup and bringing the university to the Round of 16 (after knocking out three pro-teams, especially J1-club Vegalta Sendai).

Always noticed by Júbilo, in 2017 he opted to join as a special designed player for the Shizuoka-based club. He debut as a pro in 2018 season against Shimizu S-Pulse in J. League Cup, the same competition where he scored his first goals for Júbilo.

Club statistics
Updated to 19 February 2019.

References

External links
 Profile at Júbilo Iwata
 

1995 births
Living people
Association football people from Shizuoka Prefecture
Japanese footballers
J1 League players
J2 League players
Júbilo Iwata players
Fagiano Okayama players
Association football forwards
Universiade gold medalists for Japan
Universiade medalists in football

Omiya Ardija players